Vieux-Reng is a commune in the Nord department in northern France.

Its neighbouring village across the border with Belgium is called Grand-Reng.

Heraldry

See also
Communes of the Nord department

References

Vieuxreng
Belgium–France border crossings